The  Wheeler Peak Wilderness lies in the Carson National Forest of New Mexico. It contains the highest point in the state,  Wheeler Peak as well as Williams Lake.

History
Established as the Wheeler Peak Wild Area in 1960,  the area was re-designated the Wheeler Peak Wilderness in 1964 with the passage of the Wilderness Act. 
In 1996, public law 104-333 transferred  from the wilderness south of the ridge between Simpson Peak and Old Mike Peak and west of Blue Lake to the nearbyTaos Pueblo.

Flora and fauna
The Wheeler Peak Wilderness is home to a variety of birds and mammals. Marmots, pikas, bighorn sheep, and golden eagles are year-round residents. Rocky Mountain elk, mule deer dwell in the area during the summer season, feeding on grasses and new aspen growth in the higher elevations. Although bighorn sheep are native to the area, the local population was re-introduced to the area in 1993. Other local avian fauna include many common rocky mountain species such magpies, Canada jays, chickadees and woodpeckers.

Many rivers and alpine lakes within the Wheeler Peak wilderness are stocked with cutthroat and/or rainbow trout every few years by the New Mexico Department of Game and Fish.

Flora of the Wheeler Peak Wilderness vary by altitude, and include cottonwoods, Bristlecone pines, Engelmann spruce and sub-alpine fir and many species of wildflower.

See also
List of U.S. Wilderness Areas
Wilderness Act

References

External links
Wheeler Peak Wilderness - US Forest Service
Wheeler Peak Wilderness - Wilderness.net
Wheeler Peak - Peakbagger.com

Protected areas of Taos County, New Mexico
Wilderness areas of New Mexico
Carson National Forest
Sangre de Cristo Mountains
IUCN Category Ib